Secuieni is a commune in Bacău County, Western Moldavia, Romania. It is composed of seven villages: Berbinceni, Chiticeni, Fundeni, Glodișoarele, Secuieni, Valea Fânațului and Văleni. Until 2005, it also included Bălușa, Ciuturești, Odobești and Tisa-Silvestri villages, but these were split off that year to form Odobești Commune.

Natives
 Gheorghe Banu

References

Communes in Bacău County
Localities in Western Moldavia
Székely communities